Afrodisíaco is the debut studio album by Puerto Rican singer Rauw Alejandro. It was released on November 13, 2020, by Sony Music Latin and Duars Entertainment. After releasing several projects including a mixtape, an extended play, and many singles since 2016, Alejandro finally announced recording his debut studio album in early 2020. He worked with several producers, including Caleb Calloway, Mr. Naisgai, Dímelo Flow, Eydren, and Tainy to create the album. Musically, Afrodisíaco consists of traditional reggaeton tracks, Latin trap songs, R&B numbers, electronic elements, and perreo rhythms. After his sophomore album's release, Alejandro embarked on the Rauw Alejandro World Tour in 2021 to promote both albums.

The album was supported by six singles: "Tattoo (remix)" , "Elegí (remix)", "Enchule", "Reloj", "De Cora <3", and "Dile a Él". The global hit "Tattoo (remix)" topped the charts in nine countries and reached the top 10 on Billboards Hot Latin Songs in the United States. The song won the award for Best Urban Fusion/Performance at the 22nd Annual Latin Grammy Awards. "Reloj" reached the top 10 on the Hot Latin Songs, while "De Cora <3" peaked at number one in four countries.

Afrodisíaco received generally favorable reviews from music critics, who complimented its production and the singer's versatility. It was nominated for Best Música Urbana Album at the 64th Annual Grammy Awards. The album was a commercial success. It debuted at number three on both the US Top Latin Albums and Latin Rhythm Albums with first-week sales of 12,000 units, and became Alejandro's first entry on Billboard 200. Additionally, it debuted at number two in Spain. The album has received several certifications, including sextuple platinum (Latin) in the United States.

Background and recording 

Rauw Alejandro began his musical career in 2014, uploading R&B songs to SoundCloud. In 2016, he released his mixtape, Punto de Equilibrio, which led him a contract with Duars Entertainment. Three years later, he launched his debut extended play, Trap Cake, Vol. 1, on which he fused R&B with Latin trap. After releasing several projects and many singles, he finally announced that he was working on his debut studio album in February 2020, revealing its title as Afrodisíaco, which translates to Aphrodisiac in English. During an interview with MTV News, he talked about the album's title:

On November 5, 2020, Alejandro deleted all of his posts on social media and left only one photo, with the caption "AFRODISIACO comes out in a few days, while I go to rest a bit. I love you." Four days later, he revealed the album's release date, cover art, and track list, confirming that it would be released on November 13, 2020. In an interview with Los 40, he described the album as "a very complete and versatile album" and stated that he had been able to find himself "musically as an artist". He worked on Afrodisíaco with the assistance of several producers, including Caleb Calloway, Mr. Naisgai, Dímelo Flow, Eydren, and Tainy, and recorded it in studios across Miami and Carolina.

Music and lyrics 
Afrodisíaco is a Spanish language album composed of 16 songs, consisting traditional reggaeton tracks, Latin trap songs, R&B numbers, electronic elements, and perreo rhythms. Lyrically, "about 90%" of it is about Alejandro himself, and he tries to "be in everyone's shoes" when he is writing, adding his own experience. The album's opener "Dile a Él" is a mid-tempo "dark" reggaeton ballad, with a down-tempo "slightly darker" outro, that addresses the singer's ex-girlfriend who has broken up with him to be with another man. It features uncredited background vocals by Spanish singer Rosalía. "Strawberry Kiwi" has a "summery, tropical atmosphere", while "Mood" is an urban song and a collaboration with Panamanian singer Sech. The fourth track off Afrodisíaco, "Química" begins as an upbeat reggaeton featuring Puerto Rican duo Zion & Lennox. However, it shifts into a house track with sudden flashes of high-definition house with the assistance of the Martinez Brothers.

"Enchule" was noted by the media for being different with Alejandro's usual reggaeton aesthetic and is a pop song, in which Alejandro expresses the feelings of the person on the stage where he know he has fallen in love. The word "Enchule" is a Puerto Rican slang for a romantic obsession. A collaboration with Colombian singer J Balvin, "De Cora <3" is an urbano romantic song about living with a young woman in a beautiful home, expressing the feelings of someone who still misses his partner. It talks about how you can wish your ex-partner the best, even if you are no longer with her. The hip hop crossover "Un Sueño" features vocals by American rapper Trippie Redd and has a dancehall vibe. A collaboration with Puerto Rican rapper Anuel AA, "Reloj" is a melodic reggaeton song with urban rhythms, about the sexual desire they feel towards a girl, describing everything they would do to her if the clock had more hours. On "No Te Creo", Alejandro collaborated with Puerto Rican duo Wisin & Yandel, while "Soy una Gárgola" is a re-make of Randy's 2006 reggaeton hit track. The new version features Randy himself and American rapper Arcángel, and has been described as an "electronic update". Arcángel labels himself an "original gargoyle" on the song and Alejandro has added a new R&B verse about "making women around the world move to the song".

"Pensándote" is a mid-tempo track with the assistance of Tainy, while "Perreo Pesau'" is a mid-tempo reggaeton song, and a tribute to early-2000s reggaeton. A contemporary pop and electronic house song, "Algo Mágico" features elements of trap, reggaeton, dance, pop-R&B, synth-pop, house, and urbano music. "Ponte Pa' Mí" is a sensual dancehall and modern reggaeton song that hints at an intimate and romantic situation. It express the feelings of someone who is anticipating "a return that may never happen". The two last tracks off the album "Elegí (remix)" and "Tattoo (remix)" are remix versions of Alejandro's non-album hit singles. The former is a reggaeton song, with elements of R&B and electronic music, about two people who have intense sexual chemistry and reconnect after having the "best night ever". The original version of "Elegí" is a collaboration between Alejandro, Dalex and Lenny Tavárez featuring Dímelo Flow, and the remix version also features Farruko, Anuel AA, Sech, and Justin Quiles. Anuel AA's verse references his 2018 song "Amanece". "Tattoo" is a reggaeton and pop urban song, with a danceable rhythm that portrays the full happiness of falling in love with a person. Colombian singer Camilo joined Alejandro on the remix, which features elements of pop and urban. It is about falling in love with a girl who has the singers "wrapped around her finger", the way "Camilo is willing to get her name tattooed".

Singles 
"Tattoo (remix)" serves as the lead single of Afrodisíaco. It was accompanied by a music video posted to YouTube, directed by Gustavo Camacho. Both were released on July 9, 2020. It became a global hit, reaching number one in Argentina, Colombia, Costa Rica, El Salvador, Guatemala, Honduras, Latin America, Panama, Peru, and Puerto Rico, as well as the top five in several other countries such as Mexico and Spain. On Billboards Hot Latin Songs in the United States, the song peaked at number seven, giving Alejandro his first ever top-10 hit on the chart. It also reached the summit of the Latin Airplay and Latin Rhythm Airplay charts, and won the award for Best Urban Fusion/Performance at the 22nd Annual Latin Grammy Awards. The second single from Afrodisíaco, "Elegí (Remix)" was released on August 27, 2020, accompanied by a Camacho directed music video.

"Enchule" was released for digital download and streaming on September 17, 2020, as the third single from the album, while its music video was directed by Camacho. The song reached the top 10 in Dominican Republic and Spain, and was certified platinum in the latter. "Reloj" was launched on October 22, 2020, as the fourth single off the album, accompanied by a Camacho directed music video. The track reached the top 10 in Colombia, Dominican Republic, El Salvador, Guatemala, Honduras, Mexico, and Peru, and on US Hot Latin Songs. The fifth single from Afrodisíaco, "De Cora <3" was released on November 12, 2020, accompanied by a Camacho directed music video. It peaked number one in El Salvador, Honduras, Panama, and Puerto Rico. The album's final single, "Dile a Él" was issued to radio stations on February 3, 2021, while its music video was directed by Alfred Marroquín.

The album was also supported by three promotional singles; "Ponte Pa' Mí", "Algo Mágico", and "Perreo Pesau'" were released on April 16, 2020, June 25, 2020, and March 5, 2021, respectively.

Other charted and certified songs 
Following the release of Afrodisíaco, "Soy una Gárgola" and "Química" debuted at numbers 66 and 88 in Spain, respectively. In 2022, both "Soy una Gárgola" and "Mood" were certified platinum in Colombia.

Marketing

Release 
Afrodisíaco was released for digital download and streaming by Sony Music Latin and Duars Entertainment on November 13, 2020. CDs of the album were released to retail on December 18, 2020.

Live performances 

To further promote Afrodisíaco and Vice Versa (2021), Alejandro embarked on the Rauw Alejandro World Tour. It began on July 15, 2021 at the Enigma Night Club in Raleigh, North Carolina, and concluded on December 18, 2021, at the Fair Expo Center in Miami, with concerts throughout the United States, Mexico, Spain, Puerto Rico, and Dominican Republic. In addition to his tour, Alejandro and Balvin performed "De Cora <3" on The Late Late Show with James Corden on November 23, 2020.

Critical reception 

Afrodisíaco received generally favorable reviews from music critics. Thom Jurek from AllMusic noted "a pronounced and consistent vibe" on the album that "juxtaposes elegantly layered atmospherics and innovative beats against catchy melodies set in middling tempos". He praised the production that is "carefully articulated to underscore the painstaking detail applied to the sequencing of exceptionally well-written songs" and thought the album delivers "a rich and seamless listening experience". He also highlighted multiple tracks, including "Soy una Gárgola" as the "biggest surprise" of the album, writing that is "complete with an array of imaginative 21st century beats and sonics", while describing both "Mood" and "Un Sueño" as seductive and "Tattoo (remix)" as steamy.

In her review of the album for Grammy.com, Ecleen Luzmila Caraballo named Alejandro "one of the most promising well-rounded acts of his generation", saying his fusion of genres sets him "apart from his peers". She described the album as "valiant" and "versatile", highlighting  "Química", and "Algo Mágico" as the standouts from the album. Los Angeles Times critic Suzy Exposito labeled the album "a sensuous night cruise" for its use of multiple genres, and Isabela Raygoza of Rolling Stone called the set "salacious and club-ready". Peoples Tomás Mier thought Afrodisíaco is "everything an artist just two years into his career could ask for" and named Alejandro "the future of reggaetón". Writing for MTV News, Lucas Villa stated that the singer's "talent is easy to spot"
on the album, while praising its "impressive roster of guests".

Accolades 
Afrodisíaco was nominated for Latin Album at the 2020 Premios Lo Más Escuchado, and Favorite Album – Latin at the 2021 American Music Awards. The album was also nominated for Best Música Urbana Album at the 64th Annual Grammy Awards, earning Alejandro his first Grammy nomination.

Commercial performance 
Afrodisiaco debuted at number three on both the US Top Latin Albums and Latin Rhythm Albums charts with first-week sales of 12,000 units, according to data compiled by Nielsen SoundScan for the chart dated November 28, 2020. It became Alejandro's second top-10 project on Top Latin Albums and his highest peak in his career, surpassing his live album Concierto Virtual en Tiempos de COVID-19 Desde el Coliseo de Puerto Rico (Vivo) (2020), which peaked at number 10 on September 12, 2020. Afrodisiaco has since become the singer's longest-charting album on the Top Latin Albums, spending 120 weeks on the chart as of March 2023. The album also debuted at number 75 on the US Billboard 200, becoming the Alejandro's second entry on the chart. On Rolling Stone Top 200, the set debuted and peaked at number 77. It was certified sextuple platinum (Latin) by the Recording Industry Association of America (RIAA), for sales of over 360,000 units in the United States. In Spain, the album debuted at number one on November 22, 2020, becoming Alejandro's first entry on the country's albums chart. It was later certified platinum by the Productores de Música de España (PROMUSICAE), for selling over 40,000 units in the country.

Track listing 
Track listing adapted from Tidal.

Notes 
 "Dile a Él" includes uncredited vocals by Rosalía.

Personnel 
Credits for Afrodisíaco adapted from Tidal and AllMusic.

Recording locations 

 Arthouse, Miami, Florida
 Criteria Studios, Miami, Florida
 Duars Music Studio, Miami, Flordia
 Sensei Sound, Carolina, Puerto Rico

Musicians and technical 

 Rauw Alejandro vocals , production , songwriting 
 Adrián Sánchez "Eydren con el Ritmo" production 
 Eric Pérez Rovira "Eric Duars" songwriting , executive producer 
 Héctor C. López "Caleb Calloway" production , songwriting 
 Jorge E. Pizarro "Kenobi" songwriting , recording engineer , production 
 José M. Collazo "Colla" songwriting , mastering engineer , mixing engineer , recording engineer 
 Rosalía Vila Tobella production , songwriting 
 Sky Rompiendo production , songwriting 
 Sech vocals , songwriting 
 David Alberto Díaz Rojas songwriting 
 Dímelo Flow production , songwriting , recording engineer , mixing engineer 
 The Martinez Brothers production , songwriting 
 Christian Mojica "Cauty" songwriting 
 Zion & Lennox vocals , songwriting 
 Luis J. González "Mr. NaisGai" production , songwriting , mixing engineer , performance arranger , piano 
 Angel Ruben Díaz "D'Alexis" songwriting 
 J Balvin vocals , songwriting 
 Jean Pierre Soto "Yampi" production , songwriting 
 Trippie Redd vocals , songwriting 
 Anuel AA vocals , songwriting 
 Ernesto Padilla "Nesty" production , songwriting 
 Luis Guillermo Marval Camero songwriting 
 Wisin & Yandel vocals , songwriting 
 Victor Torres recoding engineer 
 Arcángel vocals , songwriting 
 Miguel Antonio de Jesús Cruz "Guelo Star" songwriting 
 Randy Ortiz Acevedo "Randy" vocals , songwriting 
 Rafael Quiles Hernández "Álex Gárgolas" production , songwriting 
 Giann Arias Colón "DJ Giann" songwriting 
 David Torres Castro songwriting 
 Mervin Maldonado Arce songwriting 
 Jorge Álvaro Díaz "Álvarito" songwriter 
 Marco Masis "Tainy" production , songwriting 
 Daddy Yankee songwriting 
 Roberto Rafael Rivera Elias "Yensanjuan" songwriting 
 Jesús D. Valencia songwriting 
 Juan José Duque "Sinatra" production , songwriting 
 Juan Luis Cardona "Maiky" production , songwriting 
 Julian Yepez "Maya" production , songwriting 
 Michael Sánchez "Elektrik" production , songwriting 
 Stiven Rojas "Miky" production , songwriting 
 Myke Towers vocals , songwriting 
 Orlando J. Cepeda songwriting 
 José M. Reyes Díaz songwriting 
 Andy Bauza songwriting 
 Farruko vocals , songwriting 
 Franklin Jovani Martinez songwriting 
 Lenny Tavárez  vocals , songwriting 
 Justin Quiles  vocals , songwriting 
 Miguel Andres Martínez Perea "Slow Mike" songwriting 
 Dalex  vocals , songwriting 
 Ramses Iván Herrera Soto "BAC" songwriting 
 Isaac Ortiz songwriting 
 Cristián Andrés Salazar songwriting 
 Joshua Javier Méndez songwriting 
 Mike Fuller mastering engineer 
 Andrea Elena Mangiamarchi "Elena Rose" songwriting 
 Camilo Echeverry  vocals , songwriting 
 Evaluna Montaner songwriting 
 Honeyboos production , songwriting 
 Nicolas Ramirez recording engineer

Charts

Weekly charts

Year-end charts

Certifications

References 

2020 debut albums
Rauw Alejandro albums
Spanish-language albums
Sony Music Latin albums
Albums produced by Sky Rompiendo
Albums produced by Tainy